Kaiboi is a settlement in Kenya's Rift Valley Province. Kaiboi is located in the Nandi region. N. Kaiboi is located approximately 275 km / 171 miles from Nairobi (Nairobi), Kenya's capital.

References 

Populated places in Nandi County